Villa Tapera Airport,  is an airport serving the village of La Tapera in the Lago Verde commune of Chile's Aysén Region.

The runway is just north of the village, and south of the Cisnes River. There are nearby hills off the east end, and rising terrain in all quadrants.

See also

Transport in Chile
List of airports in Chile

References

External links
OpenStreetMap - Villa Tapera
OurAirports - Villa Tapera
SkyVector - Villa Tapera

Airports in Chile
Airports in Aysén Region